Everything Falls Apart is a song by American band Dog's Eye View, written by lead vocalist Peter Stuart. The song is the lead single from Dog's Eye View's debut album, Happy Nowhere, released in January 1996 by Columbia Records. It received considerable airplay on radio, MTV and VH1, reaching the top 40 on multiple US Billboard charts. Internationally, the single charted in Canada and New Zealand, peaking at numbers 5 and 41, respectively.

Chart performance
"Everything Falls Apart" peaked at number 66 on the US Billboard Hot 100 as a double A-side with "Small Wonders". It also reached number eight on the Billboard Mainstream Top 40 and number one on the Billboard Adult Alternative Songs chart. Outside the US, "Everything Falls Apart" peaked at number five in Canada, where it ended 1996 as the country's 31st most-successful single, and number 41 in New Zealand.

Music video
The music video for "Everything Falls Apart" was placed on regular rotation on MTV on February 5, 1996.

Track listings
European CD single
 "Everything Falls Apart"
 "What Fox" (LP outtake)
 "Small Wonders" (acoustic)
 "Shine" (original demo)

Australian CD single
 "Everything Falls Apart"
 "Small Wonders" (acoustic)
 "Shine" (original demo)

Charts

Weekly charts

Year-end charts

Release history

References

1995 songs
1996 debut singles
Columbia Records singles
Dog's Eye View songs
Songs written by Peter Stuart